Thong is a Chinese and Cambodian surname.

Origins
As a Chinese surname, Thong may be a spelling, based on the pronunciation in different varieties of Chinese, of the following surnames, listed by their spelling in Pinyin (which reflects the Mandarin Chinese pronunciation):
Zhāng
Jiāng
Tāng, spelled Thong based on its Cantonese pronunciation
Táng, spelled Thong based on its Cantonese pronunciation
Tóng
Tóng

Thong is also a Cambodian surname, probably derived from one or more of the above Chinese surnames.

Statistics
According to statistics cited by Patrick Hanks, 106 people on the island of Great Britain and none on the island of Ireland bore the surname Thong as of 2011. In 1881 there had been two people with this surname in Great Britain.

The 2010 United States Census found 1,378 people with the surname Thong, making it the 19,581st-most-common name in the country. This represented an increase from 1,156 (21,156th-most-common) in the 2000 Census. In both censuses, about nine-tenths of the bearers of the surname identified as Asian, and less than 3% each as White or Black. It was the 899th-most-common surname among respondents to the 2000 Census who identified as Asian.

People
Thong Saw Pak (born 1928), Singaporean weightlifter
Thong Khon (born 1951), Cambodian politician
Shaun Thong (born 1995), Hong Kong racecar driver

See also

Thony (name)

References

Chinese-language surnames
Multiple Chinese surnames